2015 Giro can refer to:

 2015 Giro d'Italia
 2015 Giro d'Italia Femminile
 2015 Giro del Trentino
 2015 Il Lombardia
 2015 Gran Piemonte